Machilus thunbergii (syn. Persea thunbergii), the Japanese bay tree, red machilus, or tabunoki, is a widespread species of flowering plant in the family Lauraceae. It is native to Vietnam, Taiwan, southeast and north-central China, the Korean Peninsula, and Japan. Its bark is the source of makko, a powder used to make a mosquitorepelling incense. It prefers coastal areas, and can handle saline soil.

References

thunbergii
Flora of Japan
Flora of Korea
Flora of North-Central China
Flora of Southeast China
Flora of Taiwan
Flora of Vietnam
Plants described in 1846